Jean Charpin (fl. 1688–1689) was a French pirate and buccaneer active in the Caribbean and off the coast of Africa. He is best known for sailing alongside Jean-Baptiste du Casse as well as for his Articles, or “Pirate Code.”

History

Dutch pirate Laurens de Graaf in 1687 captured a 14-gun Spanish frigate near Cartagena which he renamed Sainte Rose. He sailed to Petit-Goave where the officials confirmed the capture – de Graaf claimed the Spaniard had attacked him first - and granted de Graaf possession of the ship. The Governor of Port-de-Paix asked him to retire to Ile a Vache to serve as Major. He agreed and arranged for his crew to disperse. The Governor suspected trouble and sailed to Ile a Vache to investigate, finding less than half of de Graaf's crew still present and the Sainte Rose missing. de Graaf explained that he'd set the ship to sea to rescue an English vessel which had foundered nearby, and to intercept a privateer spotted in the area.

In truth de Graaf had given the Sainte Rose to a friend and former crewmate, Jean Charpin. By the time the Governor left satisfied with de Graaf's explanation, Charpin had drawn up Articles to govern the crew's piracy and had all aboard sign them. His Pirate Code is one of the few surviving sets and one of the only ones complete. Translated from the French, they read:

In early 1688 Charpin collected additional crew before setting out. At the island of Roatan he took on board Jean Fantin and some sailors from Dutch buccaneer Jan Willem’s former crew. He also embarked William Kidd and Robert Culliford, whom he picked up at Ile a Vache, two of only 6 Englishmen among over 70 French sailors. Under a privateering commission they captured a Dutch ship in early 1689, which they renamed Dauphin and carried back to New England where they sold their plundered cargo and refitted for a longer voyage. While there, the crew took a vote and removed Charpin as commander, selecting Fantin in his place.

Charpin remained aboard the Sainte Rose as Fantin sailed to west Africa, joining forces with Jean-Baptiste du Casse at Cape Verde and then returning to the Caribbean. Charpin complained to du Casse about the loss of his ship, but his pleas were ignored. Fantin captured a rich Spanish ship at du Casse's request, then joined him ashore in unsuccessful attacks on Dutch colonies at Surinam and Berbice. Charpin argued about division of the loot from the Spanish ship, and his former crew abandoned him to sail aboard it with Fantin.

When England and France declared war later in 1689, du Casse assaulted the English settlement at St. Christopher. It was there that Kidd and Culliford conspired with the English crewmen to steal the unguarded Spanish prize ship from Fantin, sailing it to Nevis where they renamed it Blessed William. Fantin left with Charpin's remaining crew aboard a captured brigantine. Little more is known of Charpin; he may have departed with the soldiers du Casse dismissed after the attack on St. Christopher, whom he sent away on the Dauphin. The Sainte Rose itself ended up beached during one of du Casse's attacks. Charpin's quartermaster Desmarestz bought a small ship named La Machine and continued on to a piracy career of his own.

See also
King William's War, the conflict that reignited privateering between the English and French.

References

Year of birth missing
Year of death missing
French pirates
17th-century pirates
Caribbean pirates